Christiane F. is a 1981 German biographical drama film directed by Uli Edel that portrays the descent of  Christiane Felscherinow, a bored and depressed 13-year-old growing up in mid-1970s West Berlin, to a 14-year-old heroin addict. Based on the 1978 non-fiction book Wir Kinder vom Bahnhof Zoo (We Children from Zoo Station), transcribed and edited from tape recordings by Kai Hermann and Horst Rieck, the film immediately acquired cult status and features David Bowie as both composer and as himself. In 2013, Felscherinow published her autobiography Christiane F. – My Second Life.

Plot
Thirteen-year-old Christiane Felscherinow lives with her mother, younger sister, and her pet cat in their small apartment in an unkempt multi-storey, concrete social-housing building in a dull neighbourhood on the outskirts of West Berlin. She is tired of living there and is a huge fan of David Bowie. She hears of Sound, a new trending nightclub in the city's centre. Although she is not old enough to get in, she dresses up in high heels and make-up, and asks a popular school friend, Kessi, who goes there regularly, to take her. Kessi also provides her with pills. At the club, she meets a slightly older boy named Detlev, who is part of a clique where everybody uses various types of drugs. The next morning, Christiane and Kessi are waiting for the subway when Kessi's mother finds them and angrily berates Kessi, grabbing her by the arm and telling Christiane to stay away from her daughter.

Christiane starts taking LSD, in addition to abusing pills, and befriends a girl her age named Babsi. After a David Bowie concert, Christiane tries heroin for the first time. As she falls in love with Detlev, Christiane begins using heroin on a regular basis in order to be close to him, gradually becoming more and more dependent on the drug until she is a full-blown addict. After her 14th birthday, Christiane stops going home and spends more and more time at her cohorts' unkempt apartment; she is also drawn to Bahnhof Zoo, a large train and subway station notorious for the drug trafficking and prostitution that takes place in its underpasses and back alleys. Christiane also starts to prostitute herself, imitating Detlev, who sells sex favours to male clients on a regular basis in order to support his heroin addiction.

After being discovered unconscious on the bathroom floor at home due to a heroin overdose, Christiane tries going cold turkey with Detlev, an excruciating experience for both of them. However, they both relapse the moment they revisit Bahnhof Zoo. To fuel her addiction, Christiane steals from home, sells all her possessions, and sinks to abysmal levels. One day, Christiane and Detlev find their best friend and roommate, Axel, dead in the apartment from a fatal overdose, due to a bad batch of heroin he was sold on the streets that Detlev believes to be strychnine. Christiane and Detlev quickly run away, ending up at the apartment of one of Detlev's male clients. When Christiane walks in on the two having very loud anal intercourse, she has a breakdown and flees. She returns to the station in order to find Babsi, only to discover that she is dead of an overdose at barely 14 years old, as plastered all over the front pages of many newspapers. In despair over the deaths of numerous friends, as well as her inability to break free from her heroin addiction, Christiane tries to overdose too. A voice-over says that Christiane eventually recovered, but most of her cohorts either died or are still addicts, including Detlev, whose whereabouts and current condition are unknown.

Cast
 Natja Brunckhorst as Christiane F.
 Thomas Haustein as Detlev
 Jens Kuphal as Axel
 Rainer Wölk as Leiche
 Jan Georg Effler as Bernd
 Christiane Reichelt as Babsi
 Daniela Jaeger as Kessi
 Kerstin Richter as Stella
 David Bowie as himself
 Christiane Lechle as Christiane's mother

Production
The film was shot with a low budget in 1980 and released in 1981, but set between 1975 and 1977 in West Berlin. It skips the beginning and the end of the book, and concentrates on the main story, starting when Christiane begins her nightlife in Berlin at around 13 years old, and stops rather abruptly after her suicide attempt by stating that she recovered. In the real story, Christiane F. never fully recovered from her addiction, nor did her troubles end with going to Hamburg to begin withdrawal.

Originally the film was going to be directed by Roland Klick, but he was fired only two weeks before shooting, after a fallout with Bernd Eichinger. Uli Edel came in to direct the film. Cinematography is bleak and dreary, depicting a dilapidated, working-class Berlin with rundown structures and dirty, blighted backdrops.

The cast is composed mainly of first-time actors, most of whom were still in school at the time and have mostly not pursued acting careers since. Natja Brunckhorst is the only cast member who continued to act in German films and television, starting with 1982's Querelle by Rainer Werner Fassbinder, at the time the highest-grossing film with a strongly homosexual theme. Real life "Stella" (Catherine Schabeck), aged 18 at the time, has a short cameo as the drug dealer that sells the first dose of heroin to Detlev. Most of the extras at the railway station and at SOUND were actual drug users and prostitutes. In the scene where Christiane runs through the alleys of the station to find Babsi, the camera lingers on several drug users leaning against the walls of the underpass. In a 2011 interview, Thomas Haustein, who played Detlev and was still in school at the time, recalled how terrified he felt being surrounded by real-life addicts, but that he was able to successfully copy their behaviour for his character. It would now be illegal to have minors act in the film's graphic shoot-up, nudity and sex scenes; at the time, however, all the production needed was a written letter of consent from the parents to proceed with filming.

The David Bowie concert featured in the film actually took place in New York City, with only some of the crew and cast attending, because at the time Bowie was performing on Broadway several nights a week and could not shoot in Berlin. The close-up shots of Bowie were from this New York performance, whereas the mass audience scenes were from an AC/DC concert in Germany.  The two were spliced together to seem as one event.

Natja Brunckhorst recalled a scene which was shot on Kurfürstenstraße where her character is standing alone waiting for someone to pick her up. "It was a long lens shot so the camera team was far away. A car drove up and I was about to get in when I saw, out of the corner of my eye, some of the crew running towards me shouting: "No! No! No!" And it came to me: this was a real guy, not an actor, trying to pick me up. I almost got into a car with someone who wanted to sleep with a 13-year-old," she said.

Reception
On review aggregator website Rotten Tomatoes, the film has a 71% rating based on 7 reviews.

Both the film and the book acquired cult status in Europe immediately after release, raising awareness of heroin addiction. The popularity of the film was increased by David Bowie's participation as himself (portrayed giving a concert early in the film) and as the main contributor to the soundtrack. Bowie's music from his albums made in Berlin during 1976 and 1977 is played throughout the picture, and as he was at the peak of his popularity during the late 1970s and early 1980s, his presence helped boost the film's commercial success.

Christiane and her cohorts are seen losing consciousness in decrepit lavatory cubicles amidst urine, vomit and blood, injecting in close-ups, cleaning and re-filling syringes directly from the toilet bowl, vomiting all over themselves and falling asleep right on top of it. In one particularly disturbing scene, a junkie climbs over a public toilet stall to steal Christiane's fix, inject himself in the neck, hand back the used syringe and thank her, in front of the horrified gaze of an elderly woman. The depiction of young addicts from seemingly normal families was particularly alarming. At the time junkies were still perceived in popular culture as much older, wilder characters, such as those depicted in Dennis Hopper's Easy Rider or in Lou Reed's songs. Christiane turns 14 halfway through the film, the same age as her friend Babsi, who fatally overdoses. Christiane's boyfriend in the film is 15, portrayed by a 14-year-old actor. None of their companions, two of whom also fatally overdose, are older than 16, as reported by end titles recalling the birth and death dates of the real-life individuals portrayed in the film. The fact that the characters prostitute themselves, both heterosexually and homosexually, at such a young age, revolted audiences.

The film was the most popular West German film of the year with admissions of almost 4.6 million.

Soundtrack

All songs written by David Bowie except "Heroes/Helden" written by Bowie/Eno/Maas, "Boys Keep Swinging" and "Look Back In Anger", both written by Bowie/Eno. According to the book, the real Christiane F. had had her first experience with heroin at a David Bowie concert some years earlier; this is told in the film with David Bowie starring as himself. The concert scene was filmed in October 1980 at New York's Hurrah nightclub, which was redressed to resemble a Berlin nightclub (Bowie was appearing nightly on Broadway at the time so director Ulrich Edel had to shoot the sequence in New York).

 "V-2 Schneider"
 "TVC 15"
 "Heroes/Helden"
 "Boys Keep Swinging"
 "Sense of Doubt"
 "Station to Station" (Live)
 "Look Back in Anger"
 "Stay"
 "Warszawa"

See also
 Memento, a novel by Radek John
 For Your Own Good, by Dr. Alice Miller, discusses Christiane F.'s case at length.

References

External links
 
 
 Movie stills

1981 films
1981 directorial debut films
1981 drama films
1981 LGBT-related films
1980s biographical drama films
1980s coming-of-age drama films
1980s teen drama films
Biographical films about children
Coming-of-age films based on actual events
Films about child prostitution
Films about heroin addiction
Films about prostitution in Germany
Films based on non-fiction books
Films directed by Uli Edel
Films produced by Bernd Eichinger
Films scored by Jürgen Knieper
Films set in Berlin
Films set in West Germany
Films shot in Berlin
German biographical drama films
German coming-of-age drama films
1980s German-language films
German LGBT-related films
German teen drama films
LGBT-related coming-of-age films
LGBT-related drama films
LGBT-related films based on actual events
1970s in West Berlin
West German films
1980s German films